Anglicus may refer to:

Adam of Dryburgh ( 1140–1212), Anglo-Scottish theologian, writer and Premonstratensian and Carthusian monk sometimes called Adam Anglicus 
Alfred of Sareshel (12th-13th centuries), English translator also known as Alfredus Anglicus
Bartholomeus Anglicus (1203–1272), scholastic scholar of Paris and member of the Franciscan order
Gilbertus Anglicus (1180-1250), English physician
Gualterus Anglicus, Anglo-Norman poet writing in Latin who produced a seminal version of Aesop's Fables
Robertus Anglicus, English astronomer of the 13th century
Simon of Faversham or Simon Anglicus ( 1260–1306), English medieval scholastic philosopher and university chancellor
Pope Joan, legendary female Pope also known as John Anglicus